Gaevskajatrema is a genus of trematodes in the family Opecoelidae.

Species
Gaevskajatrema halosauropsi Bray & Campbell, 1996
Gaevskajatrema perezi (Mathias, 1926) Gibson & Bray, 1982
Gaevskajatrema pontica (Koval, 1966) Machkevsky, 1990

References

Opecoelidae
Plagiorchiida genera